Atlas Sound/Mexcellent Split was released in 2007 on 12" vinyl. Only 500 copies were pressed on 180g vinyl. The Atlas Sound side is called Fractal Trax and the Mexcellent side is called Cornbread Jungle.

Track listing
Atlas Sound - Fractal Trax
"Axis I (F.Grey)"
"Axis II"
"Inhalents"
"'I Know, I Know'"

Mexcellent - Cornbread Jungle
"Rhonda Price"
"Blackface"
"RGDWTJPM"

Credits
Atlas Sound
Bradford Cox - voice, electric and acoustic guitar, percussion, bells, tape, electric bass.

Mexcellent
V. Fajito - music
R. Mexico - music

References

2007 EPs
Split EPs